The Terre Haute Hottentots were a Minor League Baseball team from Terre Haute, Indiana, that played in the Northwestern League in 1891, Illinois–Iowa League in 1892, Western Interstate League in 1895, Western League in 1895, Class C Central League in 1897, 1900, and 1903 to 1909, and the Illinois–Indiana–Iowa League from 1901 to 1902.

Team history 
On February 7, 1897, the Terre Haute Hottentots were formed as a charter member of the Class C Central League. Joining the Hottentots in the six-team league were the Cairo Egyptians, Evansville Brewers, Nashville Centennials, Paducah Little Colonels, and Washington Browns. Terre Haute's uniforms were gray and blue.

Severe financial problems throughout the circuit forced the league to disband on July 20, 1897. As of July 19, the final day of play, the Hottentots were in fourth place with a 31–36 (.463) record.

References 

Defunct Central League (1897) teams
Baseball teams established in 1897
Sports clubs disestablished in 1897
Professional baseball teams in Indiana
Terre Haute, Indiana
1897 establishments in Indiana
1897 disestablishments in Indiana
Illinois-Indiana-Iowa League teams
Defunct baseball teams in Indiana
Baseball teams disestablished in 1897